Rodwell Ferguson is a Belizean politician and a former Cabinet Minister of the Said Musa Administration. He is a member of the People's United Party (PUP) and has served as its Southern Caucus Chair. He was re-elected to office in March 2012 as the Area Representative for the Stann Creek West constituency in the Stann Creek District.

References

Year of birth missing (living people)
Living people
People's United Party politicians
Government ministers of Belize
Members of the Belize House of Representatives for Stann Creek West